The star cluster  Sanskrit: कृत्तिका, pronounced , popularly transliterated Krittika), sometimes known as Kārtikā, corresponds to the open star cluster called Pleiades in western astronomy; it is one of the clusters which makes up the constellation Taurus. It is also the name of its goddess-personification, who is a daughter of Daksha and Panchajani, and thus a half-sister to Khyati. Spouse of Kṛttikā is Chandra ("moon"). The six Krittikas who raised the Hindu God Kartikeya are Śiva, Sambhūti, Prīti, Sannati, Anasūya and Kṣamā.

In Hindu  astrology,  is the third of the 27 s. It is ruled by Sun.
Under the traditional Hindu principle of naming individuals according to their Ascendant/Lagna , the following Sanskrit syllables correspond with this , and would belong at the beginning of the first name of an individual born under it: A (अ), I (ई), U (उ) and E (ए).

See also
List of Nakshatras
Pleione

References

Taurus (constellation)
Nakshatra
Daughters of Daksha